The 2010 Libertarian National Convention was a biennial convention of the Libertarian Party that was held in St. Louis, Missouri from Friday May 28 to Monday May 31, 2010.

Mark Hinkle was elected as National Chair; Mark W. Rutherford was elected National Vice Chair; Alicia Mattson was elected Secretary; James Oaksun was elected Treasurer.

References

External links
 Convention Website

2010
2010 in Missouri
2010s in St. Louis
Political conventions in Missouri
May 2010 events in the United States
Conventions in St. Louis